Lieutenant General Syed Ata Hasnain PVSM, UYSM, AVSM, SM, VSM & Bar is a retired General of the Indian Army. His last assignment in service was as the Military Secretary of the Indian Army. Prior to that, he commanded the Indian Army's 15 Corps in the state of Jammu and Kashmir, amongst other appointments. He has also commanded 21 Corps (Strike). In 2018, General Hasnain was appointed Chancellor of Central University of Kashmir.

Early life and education
Syed Ata Hasnain is the second son of Major General Syed Mahdi Hasnain, PVSM. He completed his school education at Sherwood College, Nainital. Thereafter he attended St. Stephen's College, Delhi, where he received a B.A. (Honours) degree in History, in 1972. General Hasnain is an alumnus of the Asia Pacific Center for Security Studies (APCSS), Hawaii, USA and the Royal College of Defence Studies, London. He also studied at King's College, University of London.

Military career
Syed Ata Hasnain was commissioned into the 4th Battalion, Garhwal Rifles, from the Indian Military Academy, Dehradun, on 16 June 1974. It is a unit raised by his father. He eventually commanded the same battalion. He participated in Operation Pawan in Sri Lanka during 1988-90, and took part in counter insurgency operations in Punjab in 1990-91. During the 1990s, the then Colonel Hasnain served with the United Nations in Mozambique, and later, war torn Rwanda. He attended the Higher Command Course at Army War College, Mhow, and thereafter served as Colonel General Staff at the HQ Victor Force at Avantipura South Kashmir, at the height of the militancy. As a Brigadier, he served in J&K as Commander, 12 Infantry Brigade, on the Line of Control, at Uri. 

He later commanded 19 Infantry Division in Baramulla, Jammu and Kashmir, as a Major General, serving under the overall direction of XV Corps. As a Lieutenant General, Hasnain has been posted as General Officer Commanding (GOC), XXI Corps, in Bhopal, Madhya Pradesh. In October, 2010, it was announced that he will be returning to XV Corps in Kashmir, as the GOC of that formation. As GOC of XV Corps, he has held several meetings to redress grievances and concerns of commons citizens, and to bring the Army closer to them He conceived and operationalised the "Hearts Doctrine" which focused on people as the centre of gravity in Kashmir. His contribution towards improving the security scenario in Kashmir was the balance he brought between the employment of hard power in counter infiltration and counter terrorist operations and military soft power. Gen. Hasnain played a pivotal role in starting the Kashmir Premier League (KPL) in 2011, to build bridges between Kashmiris and Indian Army men. Throughout his tenure he applied an intellectual approach towards conflict and even guided the State Government in its approach as its Security Adviser. On 9 June 2012, Lt Gen Hasnain took office as the Military Secretary, at Army Headquarters, New Delhi. His unique and innovative approach defined as "Playing Friend Not God" has been widely appreciated as the new HR management mantra across domains in and outside the military.

On 7 Sep 2013, Lt Gen Syed Ata Hasnain was awarded his first civilian honor by the Capital Foundation Society of Delhi. He received the award from the Vice President of India, Mohammad Hamid Ansari. The award was for Military leadership of an exceptional order. On 9 Sep 2013, the General Officer spoke at the Global Town Hall organized by the US based Ali Soufan Group and Qatar International Academy for Security Studies. This event was simultaneously held at New York, Singapore, Dakkar and Belfast. Lt Gen Hasnain spoke at Singapore on the subject ' Applying Counter Narratives in Conflict Stabilisation : The Heart is My Weapon Doctrine in Kashmir's Conflict Zone'.

Post-retirement
Ever since his superannuation on 30 June 2013, General Hasnain has actively pursued intellectual activities and promoted the cause and perception of the Indian Army. He is a prolific member of Track 2 diplomacy with Pakistan bringing his vast experience of J&K to the meetings. He is a Visiting Fellow of the Vivekananda International Foundation, New Delhi and Senior Fellow with Delhi Policy Group, two of the most prominent think tanks of New Delhi besides being on the Governing Council of Institute of Peace and Conflict Studies.  He writes for The Times of India , The Indian Express, The New Indian Express, The Asian Age, Brighter Kashmir and The Tribune on various strategic issues. He lectures at the National Academy of Administration, Mussoorie and National Academy of Customs, Excise and Narcotics (NACEN), Faridabad, besides the College of Air Warfare, Army War College, Mhow, Defence Services Staff College and various institutions under the All India Management Association and Centre for Land Warfare Studies (CLAWS). He has recently lectured at United Service Institution (USI) and Institute for Defence Studies and Analyses (IDSA).

Gen Hasnain introduced the Scholar Warrior concept to the Indian Army, and after superannuation has extensively promoted the necessity of incorporating military intellectualism and strategic culture in India. In this regard he is a popular  speaker at corporate events. Among the companies that he has addressed include Deloitte, Deutsche Bank, Ashok Leyland, Larsen & Toubro (Design), Amdocs Pune, Atoc, Sanofi Pasteur, SBI, KPMG, Amit Rathi, Mindtree and Knight Frank India. His talks have been greatly appreciated because of the passion, patriotic fervor and linkages that he establishes between national security, the common citizen and the corporate world. He has spoken at nine chapters of the Young Presidents Organization (YPO) and the Chennai chapter of the Entrepreneur Organisation of India, each on a different subject. He spoke at the Regional Meeting of the Owner's Forum in Mar 2017 and DEc 2018; a reputed international corporate club of families who own business houses. A signature event was his talk to the visiting members of YPO Coastal California, on India-US relations. Gen Hasnain's attraction as a speaker of international repute is his long experience in turbulent zones and ability to handle touchy issues with ease. His vast knowledge of history, politics and international relations allows him to address and explain issues which would need days of individual study to understand and comprehend.

On 21 February 2020 he was appointed Member of the National Disaster Management Authority (NDMA)  In that appointment, he is currently also a member of the Empowered Committee for Information & Communication set up by the Prime Minister's Office (PMO).

Awards and decorations
Hasnain was awarded the Vishisht Seva Medal, a bar to the Vishisht Seva Medal in 2003, the Sena Medal in 2005, the Ati Vishisht Seva Medal in 2009, the Uttam Yudh Seva Medal in 2012 and the Param Vishisht Seva Medal in 2013.

Personal life

Gen. Hasnain is married to Sabiha Hasnain, who is a senior executive with a multinational company. They have two daughters. His elder brother, Raza Hasnain, is a retired IAS officer.

See also
 Syed Mahdi Hasnain
 Lieutenant General Zameer Uddin Shah

References

Further reading
 

Au Revoir, Lieutenant Navdeep Singh.. by Major General Raj Mehta AVSM, VSM (Retired)
 As General Ata Hasnain Moves to Kashmir..
 General Hasnain Moves Kashmir..
 Pragmatic General..
 A Peoples General..
 Kashmir 2011 The Turning Point..
 Seminar on Enhancing J&K's Pride..
 The danger behind Pakistan's new swagger
 Honouring faith and secularism in the armed forces: Men who fight together must pray together Times of India
 https://www.firstpost.com/india/holding-military-commanders-alone-responsible-for-setbacks-in-hybrid-conflict-doesnt-absolve-state-of-its-role-6871451.html

Indian generals
Military personnel from Allahabad
St. Stephen's College, Delhi alumni
Graduates of the Royal College of Defence Studies
Alumni of the University of London
Alumni of King's College London
Indian Muslims
Living people
Indian Army personnel
Sherwood College alumni
Recipients of the Param Vishisht Seva Medal
Recipients of the Uttam Yudh Seva Medal
Recipients of the Vishisht Seva Medal
Recipients of the Sena Medal
Year of birth missing (living people)
Sena Medal
Army War College, Mhow alumni
Defence Services Staff College alumni